Environment California is a nonprofit political organization that lobbies for environmental legislation in the U.S. state of California. It is affiliated with Environment America and the Fund for the Public Interest ("the Fund").

History
Environment California was formed by the California Public Interest Research Group (CALPIRG) in 2003 to take over its environmental work. Environment California supported and campaigned for the Million Solar Roofs Bill in 2006 and the Global Warming Solutions Act in 2007.

Structure and canvassing efforts
Environment California works with the Fund for the Public Interest (FFPIR or "the Fund") to recruit members to the organization and run campaigns across the state of California through canvassing offices.  FFPIR runs canvassing offices in partnership with Environment California to raise money and build citizen support for the group. However, Environment California fires canvassing officers if they don't meet a certain "quota" for the week.

Bernadette Del Chiaro, the director of Environment California's Clean Energy Program, defended the political value of the group's door-to-door and street fundraising in an official website launched in September 2006. The website was created solely to respond to people's criticism of the organization's methods. She states that, in her experience, this type of canvassing “absolutely elevated the issue in terms of public awareness, which, in turn, made it clearer to decision-makers that they needed to act”.

In a contrasting viewpoint, the book Activism, Inc. by Columbia University sociologist Dana Fisher, says this particular fundraising model mistreats idealistic young people by using them as interchangeable parts and providing them with insufficient training. Fisher published this opinion after completing a 2003 study of random canvass offices throughout the entire United States.

On May 15, 2009, the Fund for the Public Interest (the funder for Environment California), settled for US$2.15 million in a lawsuit over unpaid overtime, below-minimum wages, and unpaid training for canvassers and canvassing management and staff. The suit affected canvassers and other canvassing staff working for Environment California.

See also

Environment America
Fund for the Public Interest
California Public Interest Research Group
California Environmental Protection Agency

References

External links
Environment California at OpenSecrets.org

Climate change organizations based in the United States
Environmental organizations based in California
Non-profit organizations based in Los Angeles
Wilderness
501(c)(4) nonprofit organizations
Environmental organizations based in Los Angeles